Mifflinburg is a borough in Union County, located in Central Pennsylvania's Susquehanna River Valley. Mifflinburg was first settled in 1792 by Elias and Catharina Jungman (later Youngman) and their two children. They divided the land into 60' by 120' plots that were sold to other settlers, many of them German, and the village of Youngmanstown was formed. 

A few years later, George Rote (Rhoade) laid out a village just east of Youngmanstown, known as Greenville or Rotestown, after his death. Eventually, the two settlements merged at Third Street. In 1827, the two villages combined and were incorporated, the combined village was named Mifflinburg, in honor of Thomas Mifflin, the first Governor of Pennsylvania after the 1790 Constitution. Historically the town was known for the manufacture of horse-drawn vehicles, known as buggies.

As of the 2010 census, there were 3,540 people, 1,506 households, and 1,028 families living in the borough. The population density was 1,976.0 people per square mile (762.4/km2). There were 1,605 housing units at an average density of 882.4 per square mile (340.5/km2). As of 2010, the racial makeup of the borough was 97.5% White alone, 0.9% Hispanic, 0.6% Black alone, 0.5% two or more races, 0.3% Asian alone, 0.08% Hawaiian or Pacific Islander alone, 0.06% other race alone, and 0.03% American Indian alone.

Major tourist attractions include
 Mifflinburg Buggy Museum, which celebrates the era (circa 1880 - 1915) when Mifflinburg was known as "Buggytown, USA" due to its reputation as a major manufacturer of quality horse-drawn carriages and sleighs
 Annual "Christkindl Market" (a traditional German Christmas festival).
 Annual Fireman's Carnival and Parade, held in the last week of July, featuring an hours-long parade with local businesses, bands, tractors and clubs.

History 
The Borough is situated on lands that were originally granted in 1769 to the veteran officers who served under Colonel Henry Bouquet during Pontiac's War (1763-1766) in lieu of payment for their service and ultimate victory at the Battle of Bushy Run just east of Pittsburgh.  In 1792, Elias and Catharina Jungman (Youngman) and their two children, came from Fort Augusta (now Sunbury) Pennsylvania to the Buffalo Valley to settle on land given to them by Catharina's father. They divided the land into 60' by 120' plots that were sold to other adventurous settlers, many of them German, and the village of Youngmanstown was formed. A few years later George Rote (Rhoade) laid out a village just east of Youngmanstown, known as Greenville or Rotestown, after George's death. Eventually, the two settlements merged at Third Street. In 1827, the two villages combined and were incorporated. The combined village was named Mifflinburg, in honor of Thomas Mifflin, the first Governor of Pennsylvania after the 1790 Constitution.  The merged towns were known as Mifflinburg before 1827 however, because when Union County was formed from Northumberland County on March 22, 1813, that PA legislative act also established Mifflinburg as the seat of government of the newly formed county, with the first courthouse located at 406 Green Street and other government offices located in various other buildings throughout the town. It remained the county seat until 1815 when it was moved to New Berlin, and then to Lewisburg in 1855 where it remains today.

In 1845, George Swentzel set up Mifflinburg's first buggy business. Soon other buggy manufacturers set up their own shops in Mifflinburg, and by 1855, with a population of 800, Mifflinburg hosted thirteen coachmakers. By the 1880s, with more than fifty buggy and sleigh factories, Mifflinburg became known as “Buggy Town” because its buggy makers produced more horse-drawn vehicles per capita than any other town in the state.

The Mifflinburg Historic District, Hassenplug Bridge, and William A. Heiss House and Buggy Shop are listed on the National Register of Historic Places.

Geography

Climate

Demographics

As of the census of 2000, there were 3,594 people, 1,506 households, and 1,028 families living in the borough. The population density was 1,976.0 people per square mile (762.4/km2). There were 1,605 housing units at an average density of 882.4 per square mile (340.5/km2). As of 2010, the racial makeup of the borough was 97.5% White alone, 0.9% Hispanic, 0.6% Black alone, 0.5% two or more races, 0.3% Asian alone, 0.08% Hawaiian or Pacific Islander alone, 0.06% other race alone, and 0.03% American Indian alone.

There were 1,506 households, out of which 32.1% had children under the age of 18 living with them, 55.5% were married couples living together, 9.6% had a female householder with no husband present, and 31.7% were non-families. 27.7% of all households were made up of individuals, and 13.7% had someone living alone who was 65 years of age or older. The average household size was 2.39 and the average family size was 2.91.

In the borough the population was spread out, with 25.3% under the age of 18, 7.6% from 18 to 24, 28.6% from 25 to 44, 21.9% from 45 to 64, and 16.6% who were 65 years of age or older. The median age was 38 years. For every 100 females there were 87.4 males. For every 100 females age 18 and over, there were 85.5 males.

The median income for a household in the borough was $34,906, and the median income for a family was $43,520. Males had a median income of $30,568 versus $21,315 for females. The per capita income for the borough was $17,161. About 7.6% of families and 9.9% of the population were below the poverty line, including 13.7% of those under age 18 and 8.7% of those age 65 or over.

Economy and tourism

Major employers include Weis Markets (a supermarket), Mifflinburg Area School District, CVS, Cole's Hardware, Ritz-Craft (a manufacturer of modular homes), and Yorktowne (a cabinetry manufacturer). In 2005, Yorktowne management made the decision to move most of the Mifflinburg operations to Danville, Virginia, rather than comply with new air pollution regulations in Pennsylvania.

Major tourist attractions include
 Mifflinburg Buggy Museum, which celebrates the era (circa 1880 - 1915) when Mifflinburg was known as "Buggytown, USA" due to its reputation as a major manufacturer of quality horse-drawn carriages and sleighs
 "Christkindl Market" (annual German Christmas festival)
 Fireman's Carnival and Parade, held annually the last week of every July, featuring an hours-long parade with local businesses, bands, tractors and clubs

Transportation

Highway
Mifflinburg's business district is centered on Pennsylvania Route 45.
U.S. Route 15, the primary north/south highway through central Pennsylvania, is located nine miles to the east.
The most direct route to the nearest interstate highway exit involves going over Sand Mountain on an unpaved road to reach Interstate 80, exit 192.  Most westbound drivers will opt for exit 185 instead, while eastbound drivers will use exit 210.

Bus
A Fullington Trailways station is located nine miles east.

Rail
Mifflinburg was once served by the Lewisburg and Tyrone Railroad.  Today, the closest passenger rail access is the Lewistown Amtrak station.

Air
Although Williamsport Regional Airport (IATA: IPT) is the closest airport with scheduled airline service, travelers often seek out the lower fares at Trenton–Mercer Airport (IATA: TTN), Philadelphia International Airport (IATA: PHL), or Washington Dulles International Airport (IATA: IAD).
The general-aviation Penn Valley Airport (IATA: SEG) is located 15 miles southeast, and features an Avis car rental facility.

References

External links
 
 Mifflinburg Area School District
 Mifflinburg Heritage & Revitalization Assoc.
 Profile of Union County, PA
 History of the Mifflinburg Body Company

Populated places established in 1792
Boroughs in Union County, Pennsylvania
1827 establishments in Pennsylvania